Perfluoroethylamine is an organofluoride.  It is perfluorinated ethylamine.  Like other N-F containing compounds, it is obscure.  Small amounts are formed by the reaction of tetrafluoroethylene and nitrogen trifluoride.

References

Amines
Perfluorinated compounds